The William T. Hendricks House, at 218 Center Ave in Pacheco, California, is a one-story house upon a raised basement, built in 1857.  It was listed on the National Register of Historic Places in 1983.

In 1857 William Hendrick purchased a tract of land from a Mr. Loucks and on it erected a dwelling house and a flour mill. This mill was the only flour mill ever operated in Contra Costa County.

The house as built in 1857 in Queen Anne style was a rectangle  in plan with a porch all around; a detached kitchen was behind.

The raised basement has gained a door and three windows which were not part of the early house.

See also
National Register of Historic Places listings in Contra Costa County, California

References

External links 
History of Pacheco

History of Contra Costa County, California
Houses in Contra Costa County, California
National Register of Historic Places in Contra Costa County, California
Houses on the National Register of Historic Places in California
Queen Anne architecture in California
1857 establishments in California